St. Joseph's Higher Secondary School, Chengalpattu is one of the well established schools in Chengalpattu, Tamil Nadu.

St. Joseph's Higher secondary School was started in 1966 by Montfort Brothers of St. Gabriel. The school bears the Motto "In God Is Our Trust". This is an institution under the province of Montfort brothers of St. Gabriel, Trichy.

School History 
In the late 1800s, a group of local residents started a school called "Native High school". It ran till 1931 when it was taken over by Fr. Peter Aloysius and became St. Joseph's High School. This administration of the school by Catholic Fathers continued till 1966 when Fr. Mathew Vadacherry was the last Head Master. From then on the school was taken over, in 1966, by Monfort Brothers of St. Gabriel.

Co-curricular Activities 
Physical education
Games and sports
Literacy and debating association
Scouting
Social service league
Educational tours
Mathematics club
Athletic club
N.S.S
N.C.C
Fine arts association
FOOTBALL
Volleyball
Basketball

St. Joseph's Group of Schools

Branch (Chengalpattu) 
St Joseph's Higher Secondary School, Kancheepuram High Road, Chengalpattu
St Joseph's Matriculation Higher Secondary school, Vedachalam nagar, Chengalpattu
St Joseph's Primary school, Vedachalam nagar, Chengalpattu
St Joseph's Primary school, J.C.K Nagar, Chengalpattu

Notable alumni 
 Nassar, film actor, director and producer
 C. V. Sridhar, screenwriter and film director

References

External links 

 Department of school education, Government of Tamil nadu

Brothers of Christian Instruction of St Gabriel schools
Catholic secondary schools in India
Christian schools in Tamil Nadu
High schools and secondary schools in Tamil Nadu
Schools in Kanchipuram district
Educational institutions established in 1966
1966 establishments in Madras State